F-22 is a lesser-known psychedelic drug of the substituted amphetamine class. F-22 was first synthesized by Alexander Shulgin. In his book PiHKAL, the minimum dosage is listed as 15 mg, and the duration unknown. F-22 produces few to no effects.  Very little data exists about the pharmacological properties, metabolism, and toxicity of F-22.

Legality

United Kingdom
This substance is a Class A drug in the Drugs controlled by the UK Misuse of Drugs Act.

References 

Psychedelic phenethylamines
6-Benzofuranethanamines
Benzofuran ethers at the benzene ring
Hydroquinone ethers